Georges Alan Cavé (born in New York City on February 27, 1966), is a Haitian-American lead singer of the compas (kompa) band Zin.

Early years
Cavé's was born to Haitian parents, and spent most of his adolescent years in Haiti. His mother Yanick Jean was a writer, and his father was a poet, writer, and art director named Syto Cavé. Cavé often accompanied his famous father on his tours of the Caribbean (Martinique, Guadeloupe, Saint Lucia), France, the United States and Canada.

Surrounded by people who loved the arts, and born to writers, it was natural for Cavé to follow in their footsteps. During his adolescence, Alan frequently played guitar, belting out soulful and heartfelt words and melodies that, to many audiences, seemed beyond his age. Cavé's performance debut happened when an actor in a play fell ill and he was asked to sing the song "La Personne". The enthusiastic audience reception crystallized for Cavé the desire to have a musical career, and Alan Cavé became a household name in Haiti.

In 1987, he met with Alex Abellard and Eddy Saint-Vil to audition, and Cavé was quickly signed for the group Zin. The group released their first album, "O Pa", in 1989. More than two decades later, Zin's guitarist-songwriter Eddy St. Vil, keyboardist and leader Alex Abellard, and its 11 band members remain popular, with sweet ballads and traditional Haitian kompa grooves. Cavé's voice, sometimes characterized as "seductive," considerably aided the success of the band.

Career
Cavé has become a prolific songwriter, with a catalogue of songs and unreleased recordings in English, French, and Haitian Creole. When once asked what inspires him, he answered simply: “Life and people”. He said he would prefer to be remembered as writer and composer, as it takes not just talent, but passion, aspiration, discipline and hard work to write songs and release an album. He is a sought-after performer in the French-Caribbean community.

Cavé has collaborated with some known kompa artists and bands of the French Caribbean such as Malavoi, Mario DeVolcy, Tanya Saint-Val, Haddy N'jie and Roy Shirley. In 2001 he launched his first solo album, Se Pa Pou Dat, which was an enormous success. This album seems to transcend barriers of language and cultural sound, with its melodies popular in Japan, Africa and South America, even though listeners may not understand the words. He continuous to have a solo career and has released five solo kompa albums.

Discography 
 Lagé'm (1993)
 Best of (2000)
 Se Pa Pou Dat (2001)
 Collabo (2004)
 De La Tête Aux Pieds (2007)
 Timeless Volume 1 (2014)
 Timeless Volume 2 (2014)

Singles 
 Chokola 2003
 Jwenn 2007
 De la tete au Pied 2007
 Mon seul regret 2012 
 Men kann Lan 2012
 Grave sou kê'm 2012
 Lil mama 2014
 Twerk that 2014
 Fanm sa 2014
 Se pa pou dat 2003

References

 https://web.archive.org/web/20141026084244/http://haitilogo.com/georges-alan-cave-biography/
 https://web.archive.org/web/20141107232216/http://www.haitimega.com/Music_Dance-Alan_Cave_Biography/84514268557148160/article_87658398006902925.jsp

External links 
 

1966 births
Living people
American singer-songwriters
American male singer-songwriters
American people of Haitian descent